The first translation of the Bible (Alkitab) in the Indonesian language was Albert Corneliszoon Ruyl's translation of the book of Matthew (1629). Between then and now there have been at least 22 other translations, excluding translations to local languages of Indonesia (out of more than 700 local languages of Indonesia, more than 100 languages have portions or whole Bible translated, while some, like Javanese and Batak, have more than one version). The most widespread translation used by Indonesian right now is Terjemahan Baru (1985), or "New Translation" published by LAI ("Lembaga Alkitab Indonesia" or Indonesian Bible Society).

Gottlob Brückner (1783–1857) translated the Bible into Javanese, the largest local language of Indonesia, in 1820

See also 
Christianity in Indonesia
Bible translations into Malay

References

Indonesian language
Indonesian
Indonesian literature
Christianity in Indonesia

ms:Alkitab#Penterjemahan Alkitab